The Armstrong Whitworth F.K.10 was a British two-seat quadruplane (i.e., four wing) fighter aircraft built by Armstrong Whitworth during the First World War. While it was ordered in small numbers for the Royal Flying Corps and Royal Naval Air Service, it was not used operationally. It is one of the few quadruplane aircraft to reach production.

Development
The F.K.10 was designed in 1916 by Frederick Koolhoven, the chief designer of Armstrong Whitworth Aircraft as a single-engine two-seat fighter. Koolhoven chose the novel quadruplane layout, also used by Pemberton-Billing (later known as Supermarine) for the P.B.29E and Supermarine Nighthawk anti-Zeppelin aircraft, and the contemporary Wight Quadruplane scout. At roughly the same time, Sopwith were building the successful Sopwith Triplane fighter.

The first prototype, the F.K.9  was built and first flown in the summer of 1916, powered by a 110 hp (80 kW) Clerget 9Z rotary engine. It had a shallow fuselage, with the wings joined by plank-like interplane struts, similar to those used by the Sopwith Triplane. After evaluation at the Central Flying School in late 1916, a production order for 50 was placed by the RFC for a modified version, the F.K.10.

The production F.K.10 had a new, deeper fuselage, and a new tail, but retained the wing planform of the F.K.9. The F.K.10 showed inferior performance to the Sopwith 1½ Strutter, which was already in service as a successful two-seat fighter, and only five were built of the RFC order, with a further three built for the RNAS. They were not used operationally and the design was not developed further.

Variants

F.K.9
Prototype powered by 110 hp (80 kW) Clerget 9Z engine.
F.K.10
Production version with revised fuselage and tail, powered by 130 hp (100 kW) Clerget 9B or Le Rhône 9J engine. 50 ordered, 8 built.

Operators

Royal Flying Corps 
Royal Naval Air Service

Specifications (F.K.10 (130 hp Clerget))

See also

References

F.K.10
F.K.10
1910s British fighter aircraft
Single-engined tractor aircraft
Quadruplanes
Aircraft first flown in 1916
Rotary-engined aircraft